Violet Blaze is the fourth studio album by Japanese singer Nana Kitade, and her first solo album in eight years.

Release and promotion
The first press for the normal edition came with the "Violet Jewel Case". Nana held a release party concert on 3 June titled at Shibuya Mt. Rainier Hall in Tokyo. On 30 March, the jacket of the CD was revealed. Upon its release, the album reached number one on Japan's iTunes chart and stayed there for 3 weeks, becoming Nana's most successful album since 18-eighteen-.

Track listing

References

Nana Kitade albums
2017 albums